Linden is a village in the Dutch province of North Brabant. It is located in the former municipality of Cuijk, about 10 km south of Nijmegen.

History 
The village was first mentioned in 1308 as "Kerklienden en Linen". It used to be called "Groot Linden" as to distinguish between Klein Linden.

The tower of the St Lambertus Church dates from the 15th century and the church was later added to the tower.

Linden was home to 243 people in 1840. Linden was a separate municipality until 1942, when the territory of the municipality was divided between Cuijk en Sint Agatha and Beers. Both Beers and Linden became part of the municipality of Cuijk in 1994, which has been part of the new municipality of Land van Cuijk since 2022.

Gallery

References

External links
The Linden village website

Populated places in North Brabant
Former municipalities of North Brabant
Geography of Land van Cuijk